= Gersik Saguking =

Village in the Federal Territory of Labuan

Gersik Saguking is one of the villages in the Federal Territory of Labuan. It is located near the city of Labuan.

== History ==
In 2023, several destructions are organised by the Majlis Ugama Islam Sabah.
